Edmund Gordon Spence (July 25, 1897 — November 21, 1984) was a Canadian ice hockey player who played one season in the National Hockey League for the Toronto St. Pats, playing in three games during the 1925–26 season. He also played one game for the Toronto 228th Battalion in the OHA Senior A League during the 1916–17 season. He died in St. Catharines, Ontario on November 21, 1984. He had lived there since 1940.

Career statistics

Regular season and playoffs

References

External links

1897 births
1984 deaths
Canadian ice hockey left wingers
Ice hockey people from Ontario
Sportspeople from Temiskaming Shores
Toronto St. Pats players